The 2010 Chang-Sat Bangkok 2 Open was a professional tennis tournament played on hard courts. It was the first edition of the tournament which was part of the 2010 ATP Challenger Tour. It took place in Bangkok, Thailand between 20 and 26 September 2010.

ATP entrants

Seeds

 Rankings are as of September 13, 2010.

Other entrants
The following players received wildcards into the singles main draw:
  Weerapat Doakmaiklee
  Peerakiat Siriluethaiwattana
  Danai Udomchoke
  Kittipong Wachiramanowong

The following players received entry from the qualifying draw:
  Ryler DeHeart
  Peter Gojowczyk
  Frederik Nielsen
  James Ward

The following players received a lucky loser spot:
  Yuki Bhambri
  Alex Bogomolov Jr.
  Gong Maoxin
  Nick Lindahl
  Sebastian Rieschick
  Yang Tsung-hua

Champions

Singles

 Grigor Dimitrov def.  Alexandre Kudryavtsev, 6–4, 6–1

Doubles

 Sanchai Ratiwatana /  Sonchat Ratiwatana def.  Frederik Nielsen /  Yuichi Sugita, 6–3, 7–5

External links
Pentangle Promotions official site
ITF Search 

 
 ATP Challenger Tour
Tennis, ATP Challenger Tour, Chang-Sat Bangkok 2 Open
Tennis, ATP Challenger Tour, Chang-Sat Bangkok 2 Open

Tennis, ATP Challenger Tour, Chang-Sat Bangkok 2 Open